Russell J. LaMarca (December 17, 1928 – October 7, 2001) is a former Democratic member of the Pennsylvania House of Representatives.

References

Democratic Party members of the Pennsylvania House of Representatives
1928 births
2001 deaths
20th-century American politicians